Jiabong, officially the Municipality of Jiabong, is a 5th class municipality in the province of Samar, Philippines. According to the 2020 census, it has a population of 19,205 people.

Jiabong was created in 1948 from the barrios of Jiabong, Jia-an, Malino, San Fernando, Casapa, Camorubo-an, Lulugayan, Macabitas Paglayogan, Dogongan, Bayog, and Malobago, formerly part of Catbalogan.

Etymology

The name Jiabong is a combination of the terms “Hiya-an” which means a “place of preparation before an attack” and “bong” which is actually “the sound of a canon gun”. According to the legend, during Spanish time, villagers from Motiong, Paranas and San Sebastian fled to Casandig (now Jiabong) to seek refuge from the invading pirates who killed, robbed and held them as captives.

To rescue the villagers, the Spanish soldiers and guardia civil camped at Casandig and mounted their preparations for an eventual pirate attack. The Spanish soldiers cried “Ensiqueda Fuego, Hia-bong!” as cannons were fired on the invaders. After this victorious fight, remained two words: Jia-bong.

History

In 1882, during the Spanish regime in the Philippines, Jiabong was made into a town or municipio. It was made as the cabeza de barangay, incorporating the barangays of Jia-an, San Fernando, Malino, Camarubo-an and the rest of the barangays that were founded later. During the Filipino-American war in 1900 to 1904, Catbalogan, Samar, the capital town, was placed under military rule. Jiabong became a barrio of Catbalgan from 1905 until June 15, 1948,

Jiabong became a separate municipality of Samar and got its independence from the Municipality of Catbalogan on October 22, 1948, when Congress approved House Bill No. 1812 into law. Under Republic Act. No. 269. On October 27, 1948, Jiabong was inaugurated as a municipality. President Elpidio Qurino appointed Domingo Jabinal as the Municipal Mayor and Eleuterio Bacarra as the Vice Mayor.

Geography

Barangays

Jiabong is politically subdivided into 34 barangays.

Climate

Demographics

Economy

Education

Primary and elementary schools
Jiabong has 27 public primary and elementary schools:

High schools
Jiabong also has three public high schools:
Casapa National High School
Jiabong National High School
Malino National High School

References

External links
 Jiabong Profile at PhilAtlas.com
 [ Philippine Standard Geographic Code]
 Philippine Census Information
 Local Governance Performance Management System 

Municipalities of Samar (province)